Tabaq Sar (also Romanized as Ţabaq Sar) is a village in Masal Rural District, in the Central District of Masal County, Gilan Province, Iran. At the 2006 census, its population was 194, in 44 families.

References 

Populated places in Masal County